Sar Qaleh Zivar (also Romanized as Sar Qal‘eh Zīvār; also known as Sar Qal‘eh Zīvār-e Bālā) is a village in Susan-e Gharbi Rural District, Susan District, Izeh County, Khuzestan Province, Iran. At the 2006 census, its population was 228, in 35 families.

References 

Populated places in Izeh County